"Waiting on the World to Change" is a song by American singer-songwriter John Mayer. It was released as the lead single from his third studio album, Continuum (2006), on August 1, 2006. The song enjoyed commercial success as a single and won the Grammy for Best Male Pop Vocal Performance at the 49th Grammy Awards.

Lyrics and structure

The song contains a highly popular chord progression often found in blues, rock and soul songs. The chord progression is I - vi - IV - I - V - vi - IV - I, and in the case of "Waiting on the World to Change", it is in the key of D. Another interesting fact is the accenting of the beats in the verses.  Contrary to most popular music, the second snare backbeat of the second measure of the two-bar beat that repeats through most of the song features an accent on the "and" of "4", and not directly on "4".

The song's theme centers on the singer and his generation's inaction in regard to current world conditions. However, he attributes this inaction to a lack of power:

He also laments the corruption among leaders:

John Mayer confirmed this feeling of discontent between the leaders and that led to an interview with The Advocate, explaining the song this way: "It's saying, 'Well, I'll just watch American Idol because I know that if I were engaged in changing anything for the better, or the better as I see it, it would go unnoticed or be completely ineffective.' A lot of people have that feeling." Even so, the song alludes to hope for the future, with the singer intoning that with his generation's ascension to power, things will change:

Politics was a topic that Mayer had not previously tackled. On his decision to include a politically tinged song, he commented, "You cannot avoid war in life, you cannot avoid the fear of terrorism, you cannot avoid those things now, they are a part of everyday demeanor. So in that sense it's become more of an acceptable thing to comment on because it's just so much of a white elephant."

Music video
The music video for the song was directed by Philip Andelman and features Mayer walking along the East River while commissioned graffiti artists Futura, Tats Cru, and Daze spray paint messages relating to the song's content on New York City billboards.

Promotion and release
A limited-edition EP of "Waiting on the World to Change" was released that includes both the album version and a bonus, acoustic version featuring Ben Harper. The EP also is the only official source for the studio (electric) version of "Good Love Is On The Way", a live version of which was previously released on the live album Try! by the John Mayer Trio. This particular EP has only been made available through Best Buy and with the purchase of the Continuum album. An acoustic studio version of "Good Love Is on the Way" is also available on Mayer's EP entitled The Village Sessions, released on December 12, 2006 ("The Village Sessions" EP also contains the aforementioned Ben Harper acoustic version of "Waiting On The World to Change").

Critical reception
"Waiting on the World to Change" received mixed reviews from music critics. Kelefa Sanneh of The New York Times called the song "a lovely and anger-free ode to a vaguely dissatisfied generation," while Matt Collar with AMG wrote that "Nobody — not a single one of Mayer's contemporaries — has come up with anything resembling a worthwhile anti-war anthem that is as good and speaks for their generation as much as his 'Waiting on the World to Change. Rolling Stone called the opening track and first single "a moving apologia for Gen Y's seeming 'apathy. Other reviewers commented on his progression as an artist; Tony Pascarella found the song "gives listeners, both old and new, an idea of how far Mayer has come. To be frank, this is no 'Your Body Is A Wonderland.' With Continuum, Mayer broadens his fan base by infusing a very blues and R&B-influenced sound." 

Not all reviews were glowing: Entertainment Weekly and the Los Angeles Times were both less than impressed, with the Times saying that, in the song, "his mood tightens up unpleasantly". Greg Kot in the Chicago Tribune also referred to the song (in his report on Mayer's appearance at the Crossroads Guitar Festival) as "[perhaps] the most spineless social-justice song ever written. It advocates a passive approach, whereas the song it most closely resembles --- Curtis Mayfield's classic "People Get Ready" --- urges everyone to get involved, or risk being left behind". Pitchfork found in the track "the gravitas of an infomercial but only a fraction of the soul", giving it the least grade.

Commercial performance
On February 22, 2007, it peaked at number 14 on the Billboard Hot 100 singles chart. It stayed on the charts for 41 weeks. The single also reached number 1 on Billboards Hot Adult Contemporary Tracks chart, remaining on the chart for over a year. It is Mayer's most successful single (both in sales and chart positions). To date, in the US, the single has sold over two million digital downloads, becoming the 103rd song to top the two million mark in paid downloads. It is Mayer's first song to reach that plateau. It has been certified platinum by the RIAA, a distinction for downloads and sales in excess of one million. The song has found success internationally as well. It peaked at number 17 on the Australian ARIA Digital Singles Chart. It also peaked at number 36 on the New Zealand RIANZ Top 40 Singles Chart.

Track listing

Personnel
Taken from liner notes.

 John Mayer – lead vocals, guitar, group vocals 
 Steve Jordan – drums , percussion, group vocals 
 Pino Palladino – bass, group vocals 
 Roy Hargrove – horns 
 Ricky Peterson – keyboards 
 Scotty Crowe, Kristen Moss, Lee Padgett, Sandy Vongdasy, Maggie Slavonic, Harley Pasternak, Ricky Cytonbaum, Jeannie Martinez – group vocals 
 Ben Harper – vocals 
 James Valentine – guitar 
 Chad Franscoviak – engineer
 Dave O'Donnell – engineer 
 Joe Ferla – engineer 
 Jim Monti, Dan Monti, Jared Nugent, Vanessa Parr – engineering assistance
 Manny Marroquin – mixing 
 Michael Brauer – mixing 
 Jared Robbins – mix assistant 
 Will Hensley – mix assistant 
 Greg Calbi – mastering
 Martin Pradler – digital editing, Pro Tools engineering
 Nathaniel Kunkel – Pro Tools engineering

Charts

Weekly charts

Year-end charts

All-time charts

Certifications

In popular culture
 It was used in an August 2008 promo for PBS Parents.

See also
Generation gap
List of Billboard Adult Contemporary number ones of 2007
List of anti-war songs

References

External links
Live "Waiting on the World to Change" performance, on MSN.com
D-PAN music video with ASL accompaniment, on D-PAN.com
"Waiting on the World to Change" lyrics, at Yahoo! Music
"Waiting on the World to Change" music video on YouTube

2006 singles
Anti-war songs
John Mayer songs
Grammy Award for Best Male Pop Vocal Performance
Music videos directed by Liz Friedlander
Songs written by John Mayer
Music videos directed by Philip Andelman
Songs of the Iraq War
2006 songs
Columbia Records singles
Sony BMG singles